Cardiola is an extinct genus of saltwater clams, marine bivalve molluscs that lived from the Silurian to the Middle Devonian in Africa, Europe, and North America.

References

 Fossils (Smithsonian Handbooks) by David Ward (Page 94)

External links 
 Cardiola in the Paleobiology Database

Praecardiidae
Prehistoric bivalve genera
Silurian bivalves
Devonian bivalves
Paleozoic animals of Africa
Paleozoic animals of Europe
Prehistoric bivalves of North America